Artemyevskaya is a rural locality (a village) in Morozovskoye Rural Settlement, Verkhovazhsky District, Vologda Oblast, Russia. The population was 146 as of 2002. There is 1 street.

Geography 
Artemyevskaya is located 33 km west of Verkhovazhye (the district's administrative centre) by road. Silinskaya-2 is the nearest rural locality.

References 

Rural localities in Verkhovazhsky District